Thomas Downs may refer to: 

Thomas Nelson Downs (1867–1938), American magician
Tommy Downs (1901–1981), Australian rules footballer

See also
Thomas Downs House, Charlestown, Indiana